Pars-e Jonubi may refer to:
 Pars-e Jonubi 1
 Pars-e Jonubi 2

See also
 F.C. Pars Jonoubi Jam, an association football club based in Jam, Bushehr, Iran